Legend Street Two is an album by multi-instrumentalist and composer Joe McPhee recorded in 1996 and first released on the CIMP label.

Reception

Allmusic reviewer Thom Jurek states " it's a breathless and beautiful tapestry of multiphonic jazz art. Legend Street Two is further evidence why Joe McPhee is the real guy to watch in the 21st century; it feels like he's just getting warmed up". Writing for JazzTimes, John Murph said "With more emphasis on sound than song, Legend Street Two illustrates McPhee's penchant for creating terse, sonically bewildering soundscapes. ...Uncompromising in both structure and sound, Legend Street Two is a "for members only" listening experience".

Track listing 
All compositions by Joe McPhee except as indicated
 "Something Sweet, Something Tender" (Eric Dolphy) - 14:57
 "Consider the Alternative" - 8:59
 "Double Ten" - 11:04
 "E.P." - 1:54
 "Dark Doings" - 14:57
 "There Was a Flower Near Napoli" (Charles Tyler) - 5:07
 "Not Absolute" - 5:57

Personnel 
Joe McPhee - pocket trumpet, tenor saxophone, alto saxophone, flugelhorn
Frank Lowe - tenor saxophone
David Prentice - violin
Charles Moffett - drums

References 

Joe McPhee albums
1996 albums
CIMP albums